Dhumakot is a tehsil, or administrative division, located in the Pauri Garhwal district of the Indian state of Uttarakhand. It is bordered by the tehsils of Lansdowne, Kotdwar, Thalisain and Bironkhal.  It is also bordered by the districts Almora and Nainital of Kumaun.

The tehsil is divided into several revenue villages, and the main languages spoken in the tehsil are Hindi and Garhwali. Previously, it was an assembly constituency but the seat was abolished in 2012 after delimitation. The area is now part of Lansdowne seat and in Lok Sabha it is part of Garhwal seat.

The economy of Dhumakot is largely dependent on agriculture, with rice, and wheat being the main crops. The tehsil is also home to a number of small-scale industries, including handlooms, handicrafts, and forestry. There is a Government Degree College in the area.

References

Cities and towns in Pauri Garhwal district
Pauri Garhwal district